The ARIA Dance Chart is a chart that ranks the best-performing dance singles of Australia. It is published by Australian Recording Industry Association (ARIA), an organisation who collect music data for the weekly ARIA Charts. To be eligible to appear on the chart, the recording must be a single, and be "predominantly of a dance nature, or with a featured track of a dance nature, or included in the ARIA Club Chart or a comparable overseas chart".

In 2002, eleven singles topped the chart. "The Ketchup Song (Aserejé)" by Las Ketchup had the longest-running chart-topping dance single of 2002, for twelve consecutive weeks. Kylie Minogue and Sophie Ellis-Bextor had two songs reach the apex of the Dance chart, more than any other artist with "In Your Eyes" and "Love at First Sight" by Minogue, and "Murder on the Dancefloor" and "Get Over You" for Ellis-Bextor. Other chart-topping dance singles from 2002 include Ellis-Bextor's "Murder on the Dancefloor" and Elvis Presley vs. JXL's "A Little Less Conversation", which spent eleven and nine weeks atop the charts, respectively.


Chart history

See also

2002 in music
List of number-one singles of 2002 (Australia)
List of number-one club tracks of 2002 (Australia)

References

ARIA Dance Singles chart
Dance 2002
Number-one dance singles